Borys Yevhenovych Paton (27 November 1918 – 19 August 2020) was a Ukrainian scientist and a long-time chairman of the National Academy of Sciences of Ukraine. He was appointed to this post in 1962 and held it until his death. Paton, like his father Evgeny Paton, was famous for his works in electric welding.

Biography
Paton was born on 27 November 1918 in Kyiv in the family of scientist and founder of the Paton Institute of Electric Welding in Kyiv, Professor Evgeny Paton. Evgeny Paton was (like his son) famous for his works in electric welding. The first welded bridge in Kyiv, Paton Bridge, was constructed under the supervision of, and named after, Evgeny Paton. Paton junior's mother was a housewife. Paton junior was born in the professors’ residence building of Kyiv Polytechnic Institute, where his father was teaching. In 1941, Borys Paton completed the Kyiv Polytechnic Institute and became an engineer.

During the Second World War, more precisely in 1941 and 1942, Paton worked and designed electric circuits at the Krasnoye Sormovo Factory No. 112 in Gorky. His designs helped to increase Soviet tank production.

Paton had a doctoral degree in technical sciences after he defended his doctoral dissertation in 1952. In 1952 Paton joined the Communist Party of the Soviet Union. In 1953 he became head of the Paton Institute of Electric Welding. (The institute founded and formerly led by his father.) Paton never fully denounced Ukraine's past as part of the Soviet Union. In 2019 he declared he was against decommunization policies.

Paton joined the National Academy of Sciences of Ukraine on 18 November 1958. From 1963 to 1991, he was a member of the USSR Academy of Science. Paton was appointed chairman of the National Academy of Sciences of Ukraine in 1962 and held this position until his death. Paton was also offered to head the USSR Academy of Sciences in Moscow, but he refused. He was convinced that he should work in Kyiv, at his parents' Institute of Electric Welding and the Ukrainian Academy of Sciences.

Paton was a deputy of the Supreme Soviet of the USSR from 1962 to 1989 (27 years in a row).

In the early 1970s and 1980s Paton had advised the Soviet authorities not to build the Chernobyl Nuclear Power Plant.

Paton was the first person to have been awarded the title of the Hero of Ukraine, this was done in 1998.

In January 2008 Paton was appointed member of the National Security and Defense Council of Ukraine by a decree of President Viktor Yushchenko. In the 2010 Ukrainian presidential election he was a proxy for candidate Yulia Tymoshenko. In August 2011 Paton was one of the ten signatories of the so-called "letter of ten", a letter from Ukrainian intelligentsia figures in support of the policy of President Viktor Yanukovych.

Paton was last re-appointed for another term as chairman of the National Academy of Sciences of Ukraine in 2015. Paton did not submit his candidacy for the post in March 2020, which signified that he was leaving the position.

Paton died on 19 August 2020 aged 101. He was buried at Baikove Cemetery three days later.

Borys Paton was the author of more than 1,000 publications, including 20 monographs and responsible for more than 400 inventions.

Family
Paton was married to Olha Paton and had a daughter, Yevhenia, who was also a scientist. Yevhenia died in 2009 and four years later, his wife died. After the death of his wife, Paton was cared for by his granddaughter, Olha.

Research activities 
Paton devoted his scientific research to

 automatic and semi-automatic submerged arc welding
 development of theoretical foundations for the creation of automatic and semi-automatic machines for electric arc welding and welding power supplies
 research for conditions of long arc burning and its regulation
 solving the problems of management of welding processes
 creation of new functional materials

Under his leadership, electroslag welding was created which became a fundamentally new method of welding. Paton led research on the application of welding heat sources for the improvement of the quality of the smelted metal. On this basis a new branch of metallurgy was founded called special electrometallurgy (electroslag, plasma arc welding and electron-beam remelting). He was the first researcher to start intensive research in the field of the use of welding and related technologies in space.

Honours and awards
Ukraine
 Hero of Ukraine (26 November 1998) – for dedicated service to science, outstanding achievements in the field of welding and special electrometallurgy, which contributed to the recognition and approval of the authority of Soviet science in the world.
 Order of Liberty (21 January 2012)
 Order of Prince Yaroslav the Wise:
1st class (27 November 2008) – for many years of untiring service to the science, outstanding personal contribution to strengthening the scientific and economic potential of Ukraine
4th class (26 November 2003) – for outstanding personal contribution to the development of domestic science, strengthening scientific and technological capacities and on the occasion of the 85th anniversary of the National Academy of Sciences of Ukraine
5th class (13 May 1997) – for outstanding personal contribution to the Ukrainian state in the development of science, the approval authority of the national academic school in the world
 State Prize of Ukraine (2004)
 Honour of the President of Ukraine (1993)

Soviet Union
 Four Orders of Lenin (1967, 1969, 1975, 1978)
 Order of the October Revolution (1984)
 Order of the Red Banner of Labour (1943)
 Order of Friendship of Peoples (1988)
 Lenin Prize (1957)
 Stalin Prize (1950)
 Award of the Council of Ministers of the USSR (1988, 1984)
 Honoured Worker of Science and Technology of the Ukrainian SSR (1968)
 Honoured Inventor of the USSR (1983)
 Lomonosov Gold Medal (USSR, 1981)
 Member of the 27th Central Committee of the Communist Party of the Soviet Union (1986–1990)

Russian
 Order of Merit for the Fatherland;
1st class (Russia, 26 November 2008) – for outstanding contribution to world science, strengthening the scientific and cultural relations between the states – members of the Commonwealth of Independent States
2nd class (Russia, 27 November 1998) – for outstanding contribution to science
 Order of Honour (Russian Federation, 19 January 2004) – for outstanding contribution to science and to strengthen friendship and cooperation between Russia and Ukraine

Other
 2020: IEEE Honorary Membership
 Korolev Gold Medal (2003)
 Czochralski Gold Medal (2006)
 Honorary Citizen of Mariupol (1998) – for outstanding service to Mariupol
 Professor Emeritus of Moscow Institute of Physics and Technology (2003)
 Global Energy Prize (2010)
 Honorary member of the Academy of Sciences of Moldova

Notes

References

External links

 National Academy of Sciences of Ukraine
 Listen to how the Paton Bridge "breathes" – a section of the article features audio recordings made under this famous bridge
Vernadsky National Library of Ukraine
Official Award IEEE Page

1918 births
2020 deaths
Scientists from Kyiv
Kyiv Polytechnic Institute alumni
Soviet inventors
Soviet engineers
Ukrainian inventors
20th-century Ukrainian engineers
Full Members of the USSR Academy of Sciences
Presidents of the National Academy of Sciences of Ukraine
Full Members of the Russian Academy of Sciences
Honorary members of the Academy of Sciences of Moldova
Members of the Tajik Academy of Sciences
Academic staff of the Moscow Institute of Physics and Technology
Heroes of Socialist Labour
Recipients of the title of Hero of Ukraine
Chevaliers of the Order of Merit (Ukraine)
Recipients of the Order "For Merit to the Fatherland", 1st class
Recipients of the Order of Prince Yaroslav the Wise
Recipients of the Order of Lenin
Recipients of the Order of Friendship of Peoples
Recipients of the Order of Honour (Moldova)
Lenin Prize winners
Stalin Prize winners
Recipients of the Lomonosov Gold Medal
Fifth convocation members of the Verkhovna Rada of the Ukrainian Soviet Socialist Republic
Sixth convocation members of the Verkhovna Rada of the Ukrainian Soviet Socialist Republic
Seventh convocation members of the Verkhovna Rada of the Ukrainian Soviet Socialist Republic
Eighth convocation members of the Verkhovna Rada of the Ukrainian Soviet Socialist Republic
Ninth convocation members of the Verkhovna Rada of the Ukrainian Soviet Socialist Republic
Tenth convocation members of the Verkhovna Rada of the Ukrainian Soviet Socialist Republic
Eleventh convocation members of the Verkhovna Rada of the Ukrainian Soviet Socialist Republic
Central Committee of the Communist Party of Ukraine (Soviet Union) members
Central Committee of the Communist Party of the Soviet Union members
Members of the German Academy of Sciences at Berlin
Ukrainian centenarians
Men centenarians
Burials at Baikove Cemetery
Laureates of the State Prize of Ukraine in Science and Technology
Recipients of the Honorary Diploma of the Cabinet of Ministers of Ukraine